Caputh is a parish and village in Perth and Kinross, Scotland.

It stands on the River Tay.

The parish includes the East Cult standing stones.

A 120m wide cairn, known as Cairnmore, was removed to facilitate farming in the 19th century. Remains of an important Roman fort still exist nearby at Inchtuthill. Cleaven Dyke is near Meikleour in the same Parish and was long-thought to be Roman too, but is now regarded as being a substantial Neolithic cursus.

Dunkeld was partly in Caputh parish until 1891.

Education 
The village has a primary school - Glendelvine Primary School built in 1876.

Notable people
Rev Peter Colin Campbell was parish minister 1845 to 1854 before going to Aberdeen University where he served as Principal.

From 1869 to 1893 Rev Theodore Marshall was minister of Caputh. In 1908 he was elected Moderator of the General Assembly of the Church of Scotland. He died during his year in office. The famous singer, Belle Stewart, was "born in a bow tent on the banks of the River Tay on 18 July 1906 in... Caputh".

See also
Coupar Angus
Dunkeld

References 

Villages in Perth and Kinross